Type 72 Non-Metallic is a Chinese circular, plastic bodied landmine which is designed to damage or destroy a vehicle by blast effect.

Mechanism 
The mine has a slightly domed pressure plate made from flexible plastic with a raised 6 spoke wagon wheel pattern on top. Type 72 has a telescopic carrying handle molded into the bottom of the mine and a large diameter filler plug on the side just above the handle position. The mine has a crimp around the top edge where the mine body meets the pressure plate. The mine contains 5.4 kg of 50:50 RDX/TNT and is actuated when pressure of 300 kg deforms the flexible plastic pressure plate long enough to release the cocked striker fuze. When the pressure plate is moved approximately 9 mm downwards it exerts pressure on the fuze. If fuzed with the T-72 clear plastic-cased blast resistant fuze, pressure on the top of the fuze will depress the casing which will revolve due to the depression of the spring which is attached to the casing. The revolution is controlled by lugs on the inner fuze assembly which fit in grooves in the fuze casing. When the fuze casing is revolved and depressed sufficiently, the two retaining balls to will fall away in groove in the outer casing, which releases the striker. The striker is driven down by the spring, initiating the detonator, which in turn initiates the booster and the main charge. The mine is blast resistant since rapid depression of the fuze will push the fuze casing straight down without any revolution. The lugs on the inner fuze assembly will then slide into vertical groves instead of the diagonal ones. The striker retaining balls will then be prevented from coming in line with the groves in the outer casing and the striker will not be released. Instead the pressure plate will bounce back into its original position.

Similar Landmines 

Two similar plastic bodied AT mines manufactured in China are the Type 69 and the Type 81, although it is entirely possible that there is no difference between the Type 69, Type 72 and Type 81 mines other than their fuzes. The basic descriptions (dimensions, weights, appearance, colour) for Type 69 and Type 81 mines match the Type 72 very closely. The fuzes are all blast resistant and the mine name may only vary depending on the fuze used.

Because of its low metal content, the Type 72 cannot be located using metal detectors under most field conditions. The Type 72 is resistant to shock and overpressure from explosive breaching systems such as the Giant Viper and MICLIC.

A copy of the mine, the YM-III (sometimes YM-3), is produced in Iran. It is slightly heavier at 7 kg, with a slightly heavier 5.7 kg Composition B main charge, with a slightly higher activation pressure of 450 to 900 kg. Additionally, a copy is produced in South Africa as "Non-metallic anti-tank mine".

Specifications 
 Weight: 6.5 kg
 Explosive content: 5.4 kg of TNT/RDX in a 50/50 mix
 Diameter: 270 mm
 Height: 100 mm
 Operating pressure: 300 to 800 kg

Countries found in 
Angola
Bosnia Herzegovina
Cambodia
China
Eritrea
Ethiopia
Iraq
Jordan
Lebanon
Mozambique
Rwanda
Somalia
South Africa
Sudan
Uganda
Zambia

References 

 Canadian Forces Landmine Database, Canadian National Defense website
 King, Colin (ed.). Jane's Mine and Mine Clearance 2005–2006. Coulsdon: Jane's Information Group, 2005. .
 , ORDATA Online Entry: TYPE 72 (AT) `non-metallic'

Anti-tank mines
Military equipment of the People's Republic of China